Dame Barbara Janet Woodward  (born 29 May 1961) is a British diplomat and China expert. She is the current Permanent Representative of the United Kingdom to the United Nations, having previously served as British Ambassador to China from 2015 to 2020, the first woman to hold that position.

Woodward undertook her undergraduate degree at the University of St Andrews, Scotland, before going on to study international relations at Yale University. She joined the Foreign and Commonwealth Office in 1994 and has worked in China, Russia, the European Union and at the United Nations.

Early years 
Barbara Janet Woodward was born to Arthur Claude Woodward (1921–1992) and Rosemary Monica Gabrielle Fenton in Gipping, Suffolk, United Kingdom, on 29 May 1961. Her father served in World War II as an officer of the Suffolk Regiment, and won the Military Cross for gallantry. He was later elected Fellow of the Royal Institution of Chartered Surveyors (FRICS). Barbara Woodward was educated at South Lee School in Bury St Edmunds, Suffolk, and then at Saint Felix School, a co-educational, boarding independent school in Southwold, Suffolk.

Woodward was then admitted to the University of St Andrews in Scotland in 1979 and read history. She graduated in 1983 with an undergraduate Master of Arts (MA Hons) degree. She taught English, first at Nankai University, and then at Hubei University, in Wuhan, China between 1986 and 1988. She later learned and mastered Chinese. Her teacher in London gave her the Chinese name Wu Baina (吴百纳 Wú Bǎinà). In 1988, she went on to Yale University in the United States to further her studies on international relations, and obtained a postgraduate Master of Arts (MA) degree.

Diplomatic career
Woodward joined the Foreign and Commonwealth Office (FCO) in 1994. She served in Russia from 1994 to 1998 as Second (and later First) Secretary, and in China from 2003 to 2009, first as Political Counsellor, then across the whole United Kingdom-China relationship as Deputy Head of Mission, including during the 2008 Summer Olympics. From 2011 to 2015 she was Director General for Economic and Consular Affairs at the FCO.

In February 2015 she was appointed British Ambassador to China, the first woman to hold the position. She was succeeded in September 2020 by Caroline Wilson.

In 2015, in a conversation with Lucy D'Orsi, Queen Elizabeth II said that Chinese officials "were very rude to the ambassador" (referring to Woodward), during an event at Lancaster House, London.

Woodward was appointed Permanent Representative of the United Kingdom to the United Nations by the Foreign Secretary, Dominic Raab, in 2020.

Personal life
Woodward's hobbies include sports, particularly competitive swimming and tennis. She is a member of the Otter Swimming Club in London and has previously served as its Honorary Secretary.

Awards
Woodward was included in the 1999 New Year Honours list and made an Officer of the British Empire by Queen Elizabeth II when she was serving as the First Secretary to Moscow. In 2011, she was included in the Birthday Honours and made a Companion of the Most Distinguished Order of Saint Michael and Saint George for services to UK-China relations. In 2016, she was included in the Birthday Honours and made a Dame Commander of the Most Distinguished Order of Saint Michael and Saint George for services to UK-China relations.

Styles and honours

 Ms Barbara Woodward (1961–2006)
 Ms Barbara Woodward OBE (1999–2011)
 Ms Barbara Woodward CMG OBE (2011–2016)
 Dame Barbara Woodward DCMG OBE (2016–present)

Notes

References

English language 

 The Diplomatic Service List. Great Britain: H.M. Stationery Office, 2003. 
 "Descendants of John Roper-269323", Genealogy Web Page of L. David Roper, 13 April 2005. 
 "Change of Her Majesty's Ambassador to China", Foreign & Commonwealth Office: Press Release, 6 August 2014. 
 "WOODWARD, Barbara Janet", Who's Who 2013. London: A. & C. Black, 2012. 
 "Prince William coming to China", China Daily, 6 February 2015. 
 "Barbara Woodward", Linkedin, retrieved on 24 March 2015.
 "England & Wales births 1837-2006", Genes Reunited, retrieved on 24 March 2015.

Chinese language 

 "英任命新駐華大使，強調中英經貿往來", BBC Chinese, 6 August 2014.
 "英國首位女性駐華大使履新，29年前在中國教英語", China News Service, 19 March 2015.

External links 
 "Barbara Woodward: Britain's first female ambassador to China intends to forge strong links with the growing economic superpower", The Independent, 1 March 2015.
 Yale Jackson Institute for Global Affairs - M.A. in Global Affairs

Living people
1961 births
People educated at Saint Felix School
Alumni of the University of St Andrews
Ambassadors of the United Kingdom to China
Permanent Representatives of the United Kingdom to the United Nations
British women ambassadors
British diplomats in East Asia
British expatriates in China
Academic staff of Nankai University
Academic staff of Hubei University
Officers of the Order of the British Empire
Dames Commander of the Order of St Michael and St George
20th-century British diplomats
21st-century British diplomats